Kanytelis was an inland town of ancient Cilicia, inhabited during the Hellenistic, Roman, and Byzantine eras. Its name does not appear among ancient authors but is inferred from epigraphic and other evidence.

Its site is located near Kanlıdivane in Asiatic Turkey.

References

Gallery

Populated places in ancient Cilicia
Former populated places in Turkey
Roman towns and cities in Turkey
Populated places of the Byzantine Empire
History of Mersin Province